The 1936–37 Serie C was the second edition of Serie C, the third highest league in the Italian football league system.

Southern gift
FIGC decided an immediate wider representation of Southern Italy, with shorter travels. Many amatorial southern clubs consequently received a wild card of invitations.

Legend

Girone A

Girone B

Girone C

Girone D

Girone E

References

1936-1937
3
Italy